Vaiea is one of the fourteen villages of Niue.  Its population was 115 as of 2017.

References

Populated places in Niue